Dipyanone is an opioid analgesic which has been sold as a designer drug, first identified in Germany in 2021. It is closely related to medically used drugs such as methadone, dipipanone and phenadoxone, but is slightly less potent.

See also 
 Desmethylmoramide
 IC-26
 Nufenoxole
 Pyrrolidinylthiambutene

References 

Opioids
Pyrrolidines
Mu-opioid receptor agonists
Ketones